The 2002 Kansas State Wildcats football team represented Kansas State University in the 2002 NCAA Division I-A football season.  The team's head coach was Bill Snyder.  The Wildcats played their home games in KSU Stadium. 2002 saw the Wildcats finish with a record of 11–2, and a 6–2 record in Big 12 Conference play.  The season culminated with a win over Arizona State in the 2002 Holiday Bowl.  Prior to the 2002 season, the artificial turf was updated to a more cushioned FieldTurf surface at a cost of $800,000.

The Wildcats finished the 2002 season leading NCAA Division I-A in scoring defense (11.8 points per game) and also tied a school record by posting three shut outs.  The team shut out Louisiana–Monroe, Kansas, and Missouri.  The Wildcats also recorded a shut out on the road for the first time since the 1973 season.  They recorded two shut outs on the road, beating Kansas and Missouri.  The Wildcats scored 582 points in the season, good for second most all-time at Kansas State.

Schedule

Roster

Rankings

Game summaries

Western Kentucky

Louisiana–Monroe

Eastern Illinois

Tony Romo was 13-14 for 120 yards and a TD in the first quarter, but Kansas State grabbed control and cruised to the 50-point win.

USC

    
    
    
    
    
    
    
    

Junior quarterback Ell Roberson came off the bench early in the 2nd quarter to give the Wildcats a spark. Kansas State built a 27-6 lead before USC scored two 4th quarter touchdowns to make it a one-possession game. Eventual Heisman Trophy winner Carson Palmer completed only 18 of 47 passes for 186 yards.

at Colorado

Oklahoma State

Texas

at Baylor

at Kansas

Iowa State

Nebraska

at Missouri

vs. Arizona State (Holiday Bowl)

Statistics

Scores by quarter

Team

Offense

Rushing

Passing

Receiving

Awards and honors
Terence Newman – Jim Thorpe Award and Consensus First-team All-American

2003 NFL Draft

References

Kansas State
Kansas State Wildcats football seasons
Holiday Bowl champion seasons
Kansas State Wildcats football